Raju Ananthaswamy (1973–2009) was a music composer and director. He worked on Sugama Sangeetha for more than 15 years. He was the son of vocalist Mysore Ananthaswamy. He died in 2009, at the age of 35 years.

Personal life
Raju Ananthaswamy began playing music in his father's troupe at a young age. He had his initial Tabala lessons from Vid. Gunda Shastry of Hanumantanagar, Bengaluru. In addition to tabla, he could play a variety of other musical instruments including guitar, mandolin and keyboard.

Raju’s compositions and singing style was greatly influenced by his father, late Mysore Ananthaswamy . His songs, Krishna Yenabaarade, Madhava, Beldingal raathrili, Tunge Dadadalli, Heege ondu Raathri are among his more important compositions. He was well known for his songs "Yaava mohana murali kareyitu" from America America and "Hottare yedbittu" from the movie, Rishi.

Raju was an artiste in All India Radio and regularly appeared on Radio City, Doordarshan, Udaya TV, Zee Kannada and ETV TV channels. He performed with his troupe all year round. He used to set aside his weekends to teach sugama sangeetha to several students. Though Raju had set to tune more than 200 poems, he enjoyed singing his father’s compositions, which he also aspired to preserve and promote, during his performances. He was able to pass these on to the younger generation as well as his many students, through his Sugama Sangeetha schools in Mysore and Bangalore.

Notable performances
 Hampi Utsava
 SAARC Summit Cultural Evening
 Vasanta Habba
 All India Lawyers Meet *Dasara Utsava
 International Trade Fair in Delhi
 Berkely Film Awards

Albums
 Tribute to My Father
 Ananta Namana
 Hoovu
 Deepotsava
 Savitha
 Hale Beru Hosa Chiguru
 Hari ninna murali
 Madhava
 Bere Madhuveke
 Rathnana Padagalu
 Hari Ninna Murali
 Oh Mani Oh Doctor
 Yava Mohana murali kareyitu

Concert tours
 Australia – 2004
 Abu Dhabi and Dubai – 1994
 Malaysia – 2004
 New Zealand – 2004
 Singapore – 2001 & 2004
 UK – April 2008 
 US – 1988 & 1998

Original score for TV serials
 Rajini
 Dum dum digadiga
 Yello jogappaninnaramane
 Manthana
 Geethadarshana
 Nela mugilu
 Mussanje katha prasanga
 Movie-Galige Asst. Music Director

Movies (acted in)
 Amrithadhare
 Jackpot
 Chigurida Kanasu

 Abhi

 ooh la la
 Kanchana Ganga
 Mani N.D.K.
 Aakash
 Chithra

Death
Raju Ananthaswamy developed kidney complications and was admitted to Sagar Apollo Hospital, his condition deteriorated rapidly and his death was attributed to kidney failure on 17 January 2009. He was survived by his mother Shanta Ananthaswamy and three sisters. He was later buried in Padavaralli.

References

External links
 
 Deccan Herald report about Raju Ananthaswamy's death
 Hindu.com
 Indiasummary.com
 Mangalorean.com

Musicians from Mysore
Kannada playback singers
Harmonium players
2009 deaths
1973 births
20th-century organists
20th-century Indian male singers
20th-century Indian singers